Theretra japonica is a moth of the family Sphingidae first described by Jean Baptiste Boisduval in 1869.

Distribution 
It is found in Japan, China, Korea and Russia.

Description 
The wingspan is 55–80 mm.

Biology 
 The moth flies from May to September depending on the location.

The caterpillars feed on a wide range of plants. Recorded food plants are:
In China: Cissus, Colocasia, Hydrangea, Parthenocissus, Ampelopsis, Ipomoea batatas, Cayratia japonica, Vitis and Ludwigia. Recorded in Korea on Colocasia antiquorum, Oenothera erythrosepala, Circaea mollis and Hydrangea paniculata. In Japan they feed on Hydrangea paniculata, Ampelopsis glandulosa, Cayratia japonica, Circaea, Fuchsia, Oenothera biennis, Oenothera stricta, Parthenocissus tricuspidata and Vitis. In the Russian Far East they are found on Vitis amurensis.

References

External links

Theretra
Moths described in 1869
Moths of Japan